"The Heart Attack" is the eighth episode of the second season of NBC's Seinfeld, and the show's 13th episode overall. It aired on April 25, 1991.

Plot
While watching a science fiction B movie, The Flaming Globes of Sigmund, Jerry falls asleep. He wakes in the middle of the night and scrawls a joke for his stand-up comedy act. The following day he is unable to read what he wrote down; a running gag in the episode has Jerry asking people what he wrote and they all offer different interpretations.

While Jerry has lunch with George and Elaine at Monk's Café, hoping they can interpret his note, George becomes alarmed by pains in his chest and thinks he is having a heart attack; they have him transported to a hospital. The doctor informs him that he needs a tonsillectomy. George had his tonsils removed when he was younger, but now they have grown back. Kramer, being paranoid about surgery, recommends a holistic healer as an alternative. Jerry warns George that the healer who Kramer is recommending  spent time in prison. George takes Kramer's advice, because of the large difference in price. Elaine becomes attracted to George's doctor, and she goes on a date with him. Elaine discovers that the doctor has a fetish for tongues, which causes her to dump him once the date ends.

George, Kramer, and Jerry meet Tor Eckman, the holistic healer (Stephen Tobolowsky). Eckman performs a number of hand gestures to identify George's ailment, which he concludes has nothing to do with his tonsils, but with his "imbalance with nature". He then concocts a tea containing cramp bark, cleavers, and couch grass that would cure him, also prescribing that George stop using hot water entirely. However, upon drinking the tea, George suffers from an allergic reaction turning his skin purple and has to be transported to the hospital again. On the way, the EMT (John Fleck) and the driver get into an altercation over a missing Chuckle. They stop the ambulance to fight outside. The driver beats the EMT bloody and leaves him in the street. While arguing with Jerry and Kramer over this, he takes his eyes off the road, causing a crash. George and Jerry are put in neck braces and George has the tonsillectomy though he is unable to speak. Elaine visits briefly to give George some ice cream. The hospital television shows The Flaming Globes of Sigmund again, and Jerry remembers that what he wrote down was a line from the movie. As he realizes this, he notes "That's not funny."

Production
"The Heart Attack" was written by Larry Charles. Like George, Charles had his tonsils removed and grow back later in life. He was inspired to write the ambulance scene by a news report about an ambulance driver and EMT who stopped an ambulance in the middle of traffic so that they could get out and have a fist fight, leaving a dying patient in the back.

This is the first episode in which Jerry's bedroom is shown.

The doctor's tongue fetish was more extreme in Charles' original draft, but these scenes were cut over concerns that they were too dark.

Jerry's line "You're not a doctor, but you play one in real life" is a play on a famous line from a 1986 commercial for cough syrup: "I’m not a doctor, but I play one on TV."

In a bizarre coincidence, the episode seemingly makes an outlandish prediction when Jerry attempts to have Tor translate the note he wrote. Upon examining it, Tor laughs and mutters "Cleveland 117, San Antonio 109", leaving Jerry even more baffled. Twenty-eight years after the episode aired, the Cleveland Cavaliers beat the San Antonio Spurs 117–109.

Reception
Critical responses to the episode were mixed; Mike Flaherty and Mary Kaye Schilling of Entertainment Weekly graded the episode with a D, writing "What Seinfeld excels at is finding the eccentric in the apparently normal. A kooky New Age doctor? That's hitting the broad side of a barn." The Sydney Morning Herald critic Robin Oliver felt that, though he did not think the episode was bad, it was among Seinfelds lesser episodes. However, Andy Patrizio of IGN considered "The Heart Attack" one of season two's best episodes. St. Louis Post-Dispatch critic Eric Mink also reacted very positively on the episode, praising the Shakespeare reference and Michael Richards' performance in particular.

References

External links

Seinfeld (season 2) episodes
1991 American television episodes